Devil's Canyon may refer to:

Arts and entertainment
 Devil's Canyon (1935 film), a 1935 Western film produced by Anthony J. Xydias
 Devil's Canyon (1953 film), a 1953 3-D Western film
 Rustlers of Devil's Canyon, a 1947 Western film
 Devil's Canyon (album), a 1996 album by Molly Hatchet

Places

United States
Devil's Canyon may refer to many canyons in the United States, including:
 Devil's Canyon (Kiowa County, Oklahoma)
 Devil's Canyon (Canadian County, Oklahoma)
 Devils Canyon (Jacumba Mountains), San Diego County, California
 Devil Canyon, San Bernardino Mountains, California
 Devil's Canyon and Devil's Canyon Trail in San Gabriel Wilderness, Los Angeles County, California
 Devil's Canyon Wilderness - A federally designated wilderness area on the western edge of the San Rafael Swell in Emery County, Utah
 Devil's Canyon - north of the Lower Monumental Dam on the Snake River in Franklin County, Washington

Other places
 Devil's Canyon (Cañón del Diablo), a valley in Auyán-tepui, a mesa in Bolívar, Venezuela

Other uses
 Devil's Canyon (CPU), an overclockable series of Intel CPUs that belongs to the Haswell Refresh CPU lineup
 Devil's Canyon Brewing Company, San Carlos, California
 Devil's Canyon Bridge, an Arizona bridge on the National Register of Historic Places
 Devil's Canyon Dam, the original name of the proposed Susitna Hydroelectric Project on the Susitna River, Alaska